Sons of Bitches (translit. Sukiny deti) is a 1990 Soviet drama film directed by Leonid Filatov. It was entered into the 17th Moscow International Film Festival.

Plot
The plot of the film is based on real historical events in Taganka Theater, when its leader Yuri Lyubimov left the USSR (1984), and made a number of anti-Party statements, after which he was removed from the management of the theater and deprived of citizenship.  Sons of bitches  tells how the troupe has apprehended these events and the pressure the state put on them, and also shows events that have not happened – the actors' strike, the hunger strike, the threat of self-immolation. A functionary is sent to the theater from the Ministry – Yuri Mikhailovich, who is to restore order in the rebellious cultural institution. The story ends in tragedy – with the death of one of the protesters.

Cast
 Vladimir Ilyin as Leva Busygin
 Larisa Udovichenko as Tatyana, Busygin's wife
 Aleksandr Abdulov as Igor Gordynsky
 Evgeni Evstigneev as Andrey Ivanovich Nanaytsev
 Liya Akhedzhakova as Ella Ernestovna, Nanaytsev's wife
 Vladimir Samoilov as Pyotr Yegorovich, Theater's Director
 Yelena Tsyplakova as Lidiya Nikolaevna Fedyaeva
 Tatyana Kravchenko as Serafima Mikhailovna Korzukhina
 Nina Shatskaya as Elena Konstantinovna Gvozdilova
 Sergey Makovetskiy as Borya Sinyukhaev

Production
At first, Larisa Udovichenko refused to play the scene where she undresses totally nude in front of the official, played by director Leonid Filatov himself, and in the episode of seduction she starred partially dressed (photos were left from the filming). But then, as Larisa Udovichenko recalled, "Lenya came to me with his wife Nina Shatskaya and on his knees begged me to be naked. Otherwise, the shock that his hero should experience does not work." Filatov promised that everything will be filmed delicately. "Lenya did not deceive me: there was no vulgarity. But all the same, I felt bad after that - I was ashamed in front of my parents, daughter, close friends," Udovichenko said.

References

External links
 

1990 films
1990 comedy-drama films
1990 directorial debut films
1990s Russian-language films
Soviet comedy-drama films
Films based on actual events